James Isaac "J. J." Miller, Jr. (born August 23, 1979) is an American professional basketball player. He played overseas since 2001 and has played in multiple countries, including France, the Netherlands, Belgium and Sweden. Since 2012 he is a Borås Basket player and one of the top players in the Swedish Basketligan.

He started his professional career in the Netherlands with Landstede Basketbal in 2001. After that period he played with Brest of the French LNB Pro B and in his home country for the Pennsylvania ValleyDawgs. He also played for the Sundsvall Dragons from 2004 till 2005. In the 2005–06 season he played with Demon Astronauts Amsterdam and won the NBB Cup with Amsterdam. He was one of the top scorers in the Eredivisie with 17.6 points per game.

In 2012 Miller returned to Sweden, this time to play for Borås Basket. From that moment, Miller was one of the top tier players in the Swedish Basketligan. He led the league in scoring in the 2012–13 and 2013–14 seasons with 21.6 and 23.7, respectively, points per game.

Miller has also played for Levallois SCB, Optima Gent, Leuven Bears, STB Le Havre and Poitiers Basket 86 under his career.

Career statistics

Domestic

|-
|style="text-align:left;"|2005-06
|style="text-align:left;"|Amsterdam
|Eredivise||25||||34.2||.492||.409||.769||3.4||3.1||2.2||.0||17.6
|-
|style="text-align:left;background"|2006-07
|style="text-align:left;"|Levallois
|LNB Pro B||34||||33.0||.416||.338||.793||3.0||3.2||1.4||.0||14.2
|-
|style="text-align:left;background"|2007-08
|style="text-align:left;"|Gent
|BLB Division 1||33||||32.3||.441||.313||.808||2.6||2.2||1.5||.0||17.2
|-
|style="text-align:left;background"|2009-10
|style="text-align:left;"|Le Havre
|LNB Pro A||30||||32.3||.428||.336||.833||1.8||3.8||1.5||.0||14.0
|-
|style="text-align:left;background"|2010-11
|style="text-align:left;"|Leuven
|BLB Division 1||34||||33.0||.468||.408||.780||2.3||2.7||1.4||.1||15.1
|-
|style="text-align:left;background"|2011-12
|style="text-align:left;"|Poitiers
|LNB Pro A||26||||24.8||.381||.357||.833||1.8||2.4||1.0||.1||10.3
|-
|style="text-align:left;background"|2012-13
|style="text-align:left;" rowspan=3|Borås
|rowspan=3|Basketligan||32||||36.3||.472||.417||.840||3.2||style="background:#cfecec;"|6.1||.9||.1||style="background:#cfecec;"|21.6
|-
|style="text-align:left;background"|2013-14
||36||||35.3||.493||.401||.864||4.2||3.8||1.1||.1||style="background:#cfecec;"|23.7
|-
|style="text-align:left;background"|2014-15
||34||||31.9||.486||.367||.795||2.4||4.5||1.0||.2||17.7

Honours

References

External links
RealGM.com profile
FIBA.com profile

1979 births
Living people
Borås Basket players
Amsterdam Basketball players
American expatriate basketball people in Belgium
American expatriate basketball people in France
American expatriate basketball people in the Netherlands
American expatriate basketball people in Sweden
American expatriate basketball people in Venezuela
American men's basketball players
Basketball players from North Carolina
Gaiteros del Zulia players
Gent Hawks players
Landstede Hammers players
Leuven Bears players
North Carolina A&T Aggies men's basketball players
People from Duplin County, North Carolina
Point guards
Poitiers Basket 86 players
SOMB Boulogne-sur-Mer players
STB Le Havre players
Sundsvall Dragons players
Trotamundos B.B.C. players